Mama Bhanja is a 1977 Bollywood film directed by Naresh Kumar.

Cast
 Shammi Kapoor as Shankar Lal
 Randhir Kapoor as Mohan Lal
 Parveen Babi as Madhu Malini

Soundtrack
The music is composed by Rajesh Roshan, and the songs are written by Rajinder Krishan.

External links
 

1977 films
Films scored by Rajesh Roshan
1970s Hindi-language films